Luis Héctor Cristaldo Ruiz Díaz (born August 31, 1969 in Formosa, Argentina) is an Argentine-born Bolivian football midfielder.

He is Bolivia's national team record cap holder alongside Marco Sandy.

Club career
Born in Argentina, he relocated to Santa Cruz, Bolivia at the age of 15. Cristaldo then began attending the prestigious Tahuichi football academy, and by the time he was 18 years old he made his official debut in first division. He played for Bolivian teams Oriente Petrolero (1990–92) and Bolívar (1993–98), winning 4 national titles combined during those years.

In 1998, he went abroad to play for Sporting de Gijón in Spain and later with Cerro Porteño and Sol de América in Paraguay, not to mention a previous spell he had during 1994 with Argentine club Mandiyú de Corrientes and legendary Diego Maradona as the manager.

In 2001, Cristaldo returned to Bolivia and played with The Strongest for the next six years. In 2007, during his second spell with Oriente Petrolero he called it quits, laying his football career to rest permanently after seventeen years of professional football.

International career
Cristaldo played at the 1987 FIFA U-16 World Championship in Canada.

He and Marco Sandy hold the record for the most appearances for the Bolivia national team with 93 international matches and 5 goals between 1989 and 2005, including two appearances in the 1994 FIFA World Cup. Cristaldo made his international debut on September 10, 1989 in a World Cup Qualifier against Uruguay in Montevideo (2-0 loss) and equalled Sandy's record in his final match against Brazil in October 2005. He represented his country in 33 FIFA World Cup qualification matches and at the 1999 FIFA Confederations Cup.

Honours

Club
 Oriente Petrolero (1)
 Liga de Fútbol Profesional Boliviano: 1990
 Bolívar (3)
 Liga de Fútbol Profesional Boliviano: 1994, 1996, 1997
 The Strongest (3)
 Liga de Fútbol Profesional Boliviano: 2003 (A), 2003 (C), 2004 (C)

References

External links
 
 BDFA profile  
 comunidadboliviana article 
 Argentine Primera statistics at Fútbol XXI  

1969 births
Living people
People from Formosa Province
Argentine emigrants to Bolivia
Naturalized citizens of Bolivia
Association football defenders
Argentine footballers
Bolivian footballers
Bolivia international footballers
Bolivia youth international footballers
1993 Copa América players
1995 Copa América players
1997 Copa América players
1999 Copa América players
1994 FIFA World Cup players
1999 FIFA Confederations Cup players
2004 Copa América players
Oriente Petrolero players
Club Bolívar players
Textil Mandiyú footballers
Sporting de Gijón players
Cerro Porteño players
The Strongest players
Guabirá players
Bolivian expatriate footballers
Expatriate footballers in Spain
Expatriate footballers in Paraguay
Bolivian Primera División players
La Liga players
Club Deportivo Guabirá managers